Tattersett is a village and civil parish in the English county of Norfolk.
For the purposes of local government, it falls within the district of North Norfolk.

The village is on the north side of the A148 King's Lynn to Cromer road. The River Tat,  a tributary of the River Wensum, rises close to the village.

Origins
The Tattersett name derives from the old English name of Tatessete, which means Tathere’s dwelling. The village is mentioned in the Domesday Book of 1086 as a village called Tatessete in the ancient hundred of Brothercross, and is said to be the land of William de Warenne, 1st Earl of Surrey.

The boundaries of the hundreds of Norfolk at the time of the Domesday survey remained largely unchanged, and were anciently divided into leets of which no trace remains. Yet it may be possible to determine the leets of Brothercross and specifically the leet that Tattersett parish was within. At the time of Domesday, the parishes of the hundreds of Brothercross and Gallow "were strangely intermixed". When Tattersett parish was transferred to Gallow hundred (well before 1638), all the parishes that used the same prior lete court were likely included. Since the end of the 19th century, Gallow hundred has been superseded by other administrative units of government.

The village sign of Tattersett is in the middle of the village green, opposite Mallard Cottages.

Notes

External links

North Norfolk
Villages in Norfolk
Civil parishes in Norfolk